is a Japanese talent, actress, singer and model. She was a member of the girl group Prizmmy before their disbandment in 2017.

Early life 
Kusakabe is an only child from Kanagawa Prefecture.

Career 
In 2008, Kusakabe participated in Ciao Girls Audition. Mia was a 3rd generation Roni Girl member along with Karin, Reina and Hina. She is also a 3rd generation "Dance Style Kids" and has modeled for Nico Puchi.

2012 - 2017: Prizmmy 
Kusakabe debuted as the Fashion Leader (Sub Leader) of Prizmmy on March 16, 2012, with the single "Everybody's Gonna Be Happy". Prizmmy members were regularly cast at the endings of the Pretty Rhythm series. They were given anime versions. She was named "Mia Ageha", and was portrayed as the main character and leader. Her catchphrase in the anime is "Mia ga ichiban"  meaning "Mia is number 1". Hina and Mia recorded a duet "Kyuraruri Kyurirura" that was released in their mini-album Love Trooper. Prizmmy then disbanded on March 31, 2017, with their last album Prizmmy☆ THE BEST!  that was released on February 22, 2017.

2016 - 2018: Solo Activities Debut 
Kusakabe was one of the 7 regular members of Law of R  on NHK E before the show's cancellation. She won the "Conomi Uniform Award" in Conomi Grand Prix in 2016. She was a guest in Ultra Teen Fes 2016 and Ultra Teen Fest 2017. She also featured in the catalogs of Inner Press, Roni Girl, Chubby Gang and Conomi Uniforms.

On January 23, 2018, it was revealed that Kusakabe was the motion capture for Mia Hanazono in Idol Time PriPara, performing the Prizmmy song "Dear my Future".

Kusakabe appeared in various stage plays in 2016 and in 2017. In the middle of 2018, Kusakabe left Avex, for ING (a stock company).

2019 - present: Radio, MC & Drama Debut 
In early May 2019, Kusakabe announced that she has joined "Miyuki Watanabe's Girls Unit Audition" through the app 'Mysta'. On August 31, 2019, Kusakabe announced she was one of the 32 out of 120 people who passed the fifth screening.

Theatre

Stage Plays

Filmography

Shows

Drama

Radio

References

External links 
 Official YouTube Channel
ING Profile

2000 births
Living people